DieHard is an American brand of automotive battery and parts owned by Advance Auto Parts and sold exclusively at Advance, Carquest and Sears stores. Advance bought the DieHard brand from Sears in December 2019.

The brand dates to 1967, having been developed by Globe-Union Battery for Sears. 
Globe-Union was later bought out by Johnson Controls, who continued to manufacture the DieHard for Sears. In its earliest years, the brand was guaranteed to last "forever," that is, as long as the original owner still owned the car in which it was originally installed, in contrast to traditional pro rata battery warranties. The policy later was discontinued.

In 2019 Johnson Controls sold their battery division to Clarios, LLC, who manufacture DieHard brand, along with Duralast, Varta, and AC Delco, as well as 20 other brands. For a time, DieHard batteries were also manufactured by Exide. In March 2001, Exide pleaded guilty to fraud conspiracy charges and agreed to pay a fine of $27.5 million to end a federal criminal investigation into auto-battery sales to customers of Sears, Roebuck & Company. The case arose from investigations and accusations that Exide conspired with Sears to sell used batteries as new to Sears customers and that Exide officials had paid bribes to conceal the fraud. DieHard battery manufacturing afterward returned to Johnson Controls. 

The DieHard brand is also used on hand tools, power tools, battery chargers, booster cables, power inverters, alkaline batteries, tires, work boots, and the batteries for Craftsman power tools. Battery chargers were initially made by Associated Equipment under the "608" model prefix, and then later Schumacher Electric under the "200" model prefix.

In 2017, Sears launched a pilot location in San Antonio for a DieHard-branded auto service franchise, DieHard Auto Center Driven by Sears Auto. The intent was to operate standalone versions of the Sears Auto Center locations attached to Sears department stores; the location was chosen because it was in proximity to a Sears location that had closed. Sears opened another location at Oakland Mall in Troy, Michigan.

Advance Auto Parts announced on December 23, 2019, that it had bought the DieHard brand for $200 million.

See also
Sears XDH-1

References

External links 
DieHard 

Sears Holdings brands
American brands
Companies that filed for Chapter 11 bankruptcy in 2018
Automotive companies of the United States